Rnd is a subclass of the Rho family of GTPases and includes:

Rnd1
Rnd2
Rnd3 (also called RhoE)

Functions include downregulation of stress fibres and focal adhesions.

See also
Rho family of GTPases

References

EC 3.6.5